Malaikkallan is a 1954 Indian Tamil-language action film starring P. Bhanumathi and M. G. Ramachandran. The film was released on 22 July 1954, and was an astounding success and highest collection of the year. It ran more than 140 days in Chennai and all other major cities. It was the first Tamil film to win a President's Silver Medal. It was the first Indian movie to be remade in five other languages.

Plot 
Vijayapuri, a beautiful hillside hamlet appears serene and restful to a casual passerby. But the happenings there are far from tranquil. Dacoities, burglaries and even kidnappings seem to be commonplace occurrences. One established perpetrator of at least some of the crimes is Kaathavarayan, his secret accomplices being some well-known public figures like the rich young wastrel Veerarajan and the Kuttipatti Zamindar.

The other dacoit is apparently the mysterious Malaikkallan. Legends are galore on his fabulous wealth, awe-inspiring exploits, contempt for the unprincipled rich, concern for the poor and needy indeed he seems to be running a veritable empire in some hidden hillock; no one has actually seen him.

There is also the wealthy merchant Abdul Raheem, who seems to disappear at regular intervals from Vijayapuri, claiming business calls at far-off places. In this hotbed of intrigue and suspicion blooms an innocent rose Poonkothai, daughter of the upright Sokkesa Mudaliar. Veerarajan is the cousin of Poonkothai and desires to marry her, but his evil reputation ensures the impossibility of such an alliance. Having lost her mother at an early age, Poonkothai is brought up by her widowed aunt Kamakshi Ammal. Kamakshi Ammal's only son Kumaraveeran went missing many years back.

Faced by stringent public criticism for their failure to tackle the audacious crimes, Sub-Inspector Arumugam arrives in Vijayapuram. But his assistant Constable Karuppiah is a bungling coward and is more a hindrance than a help in his investigations. It is at this juncture that one night when Mudaliar is away, Poonkothai is kidnapped. The happenings of that eerie night keep the village tongues wagging for many days thereafter. Two sidekicks of Kathavarayan are found tied and hanging upside down, and a piece of Poonkothai's jewellery is recovered from them. Kamakshi Ammal is found tied-up and unconscious, and a mysterious errand-boy hands over to the attending doctor a forest herb that revives her at once. Poonkothai is said to be in the custody of Malaikkallan, who has cleverly waylaid Kathavarayan's men and taken away Poonkothai. Kathavarayan faces the ire and ridicule of Veerarajan at the behest of whom he had engineered Poonkothai's kidnapping. Goaded by this humiliation, he now sends his men far and wide in search of Poonkothai. Meanwhile, Poonkothai is safe in the magnificent hideout of Malaikkallan, perceiving his genuine concern for the downtrodden and the reverence with which he is held by his people, her contempt and mistrust turn gradually into admiration and leads to love.

Several confounding twists and turns later the truant pieces of the puzzle fall in place. Kathavarayan and Veerarajan get their well-deserved comeuppance. Malaikkallan and Abdul Raheem both turn out to be the same person who is the long-missing Kumaraveeran. All is well that ends with the happy marriage of Poonkothai and Kumaraveeran.

Cast 
Cast according to the opening credits of the film

Male Cast
 M. G. Ramachandran as Malaikkallan,Kumaraveeran, Abdul Rahim
 Sriram as Veerarajan
 T. S. Durairaj as Aid Karuppaiah
 D. Balasubramaniam as Sokkesa Mudaliar
 M. G. Chakrapani as Sub Inspector
 E. R. Sahadevan as Kathavarayan
 V. M. Ezhumalai as Satayan
 S. M. Thirupathi Sami as Guttipatti Zamindar
 K. Duraisami as Old Mallaikallan
 S. M. Subbaiah as Doctor
 Thomas & Rayappan as Police Jawans
 Kanaiah as Kannappar
 Murugesan as Bandyman
 Soundararajan, Vellingiri, Kareem, Arumugam,Rathnavelu as Malaikkallan's People

Female Cast
 P. Bhanumathi as Poongothai
 P. S. Gnanam as Kamakshi Ammal
 Surabhi Balasaraswathi as Janaki
 Sandhya as Chinni
 Shantha as Senkamalam
 Sayee as Alli
 Subbulakshmi as Valli
Dance
 Sayee & Subbulakshmi

Production 
A blend of Robin Hood and The Mark of Zorro, written by Namakkal Kavignar Va. Ramalingam Pillai (Namakkal Kavignar). Malaikkallan had been prescribed as the non-detailed text for the high school curriculum in the early 50s, and the story had become very popular.

A. P. Nagarajan was cast as a police inspector; however, after shooting some scenes with him, Naidu chose to replace him with M. G. Chakrapani.

Soundtrack 
S. M. Subbiah Naidu scored the music, while the lyrics were penned by Namakkal Kavignar Ve. Ramalingam Pillai, Ku. Ma. Balasubramaniam, Thanjai N. Ramaiah Dass and Makkalanban. The song "Eththanai Kaalam Thaan Yemaatruvaar" became so popular that MGR then decided to insert at least one such philosophical song in his future projects. It was the first song that T. M. Soundararajan had sung for M. G. Ramachandran, after the success he sang many songs for him. The song was remixed by Leon James for the film LKG (2019).

Release 
Malaikkallan was released on 22 July 1954. It emerged as the top grosser of the year. Tamil magazine Ananda Vikatan in its review dated 12 September 1954 mentioned that film "has several amazing moments which increase the heartbeats of the audience... Various fight scenes, dances and comedy scenes make the film a mass entertainer". The Indian Express wrote, "Obviously with an eye on the box office the picture has been plentifully interspersed with fist and sword fights and fencing displays, etc".

Remakes 
S. M. Sriramulu Naidu of Pakshiraja Studio in Coimbatore secured the rights to the story and decided to produce and direct a movie based on it, in 5 languages apart from the original version – Tamil (Malaikkallan), Telugu (Aggi Ramudu), Malayalam (Thaskaraveeran), Kannada (Bettada Kalla), Hindi (Azaad) and Sinhalese (Surasena).

Legacy 
The film created the trend of the concept of "Robin Hood" and inspired various films like Neelamalai Thirudan (1957), Malaiyoor Mambattiyan (1983), Gentleman (1993) and Sivaji: The Boss (2007). The film also created the trend of philosophical songs and introduction songs for the lead actors.

Awards 
 The film won National Film Award for Best Feature Film in Tamil – President's Silver Medal in 1954 at 2nd National Film Awards.

References

Bibliography

Further reading 
behindwoods.com, "Malaikallan for Diwali"

hindu.com

External links 

1950s action adventure films
1950s Tamil-language films
1954 films
Best Tamil Feature Film National Film Award winners
Films scored by S. M. Subbaiah Naidu
Films with screenplays by M. Karunanidhi
Indian action adventure films
Indian swashbuckler films
Robin Hood films
Tamil films remade in other languages
Films directed by S. M. Sriramulu Naidu
Indian black-and-white films